International Business Wales (IBW) is a development agency of the Welsh Government set up with the remit of delivering support to help companies establish themselves in Wales. Once established in the country, companies are allocated a relationship manager with the skills to help grow the business and are offered a relocation service that helps their executives settle there.

IBW Structure
IBW provide the trade and investment arm of the Welsh Government. Established in 2006, it brought together the responsibilities of the former Welsh Development Agency and Wales Trade International.

Sitting under the Department for the Economy and Transport (DE&T) IBW is tasked with developing international trade, and attracting inward investment, relocation and international collaboration.

Track record
IBW claims it has an impressive track record with Wales being one of Europe's most successful investment locations.  With a population of 2.9 million and a workforce of 1.3 million, Wales has attracted over £16.8 billion of capital investment and over 282,000 jobs have been created or safeguarded through inward investment (between 1983 and  March 2008).

Over 500 international companies are located in the country including many of the world's largest multinationals such as Ford, EDS and Alcatel.

Area covered
IBW offer support to companies looking at Wales as a business destination for expansion/relocation as well as supporting the companies located in the country with their international trade requirements.
Inward Investment – project management support to advise companies on all aspects of relocation from grants and skilled workforce availability through to property searches and a relocation service for business people under the “Welcome to Wales” programme.
International Trade – services for both native Welsh companies and international business looking for a trade partner in Wales, with support from advisors. IBW provide support tailored to company import and export needs.

Criticism
In July 2009, using information obtained from a Freedom of Information request to the Welsh government, the Welsh Liberal Democrats criticised International Business Wales officials for running up a bill of £750,000, on 35 different corporate credit card accounts for the year June 2008 to end of May 2009, at the tax-payers expense. Liberal Democrat leader Kirsty Williams AM said: 
"In the middle of a recession it's disgusting to know that public officials are flying first class, staying in the most expensive hotels, eating in the best restaurants - all at the swipe of the Welsh credit card."

First Minister Rhodri Morgan at first refuted the allegation. He later publicly apologised in a letter to Kirsty Williams and said that he had been misled by IBW officials, whom he had believed at the time: 
"I stated, on the clear and explicit advice from the relevant senior officials that no officials from IBW (International Business Wales) had flown first class. Today I have learned that this is not the case. I apologise for having misled you and the wider public."

He added that he was setting up an investigation and independent review:
"I need hardly say how disturbed I am by this latest information now to hand. I am instructing the Permanent Secretary to undertake an immediate and thorough investigation and audit of IBW's expenditure and audit systems. This review will be led from outside the Assembly Government."

Support
Following the July 2009 press coverage a group of Welsh exporters have shown their support for International Business Wales, calling on politicians to "stop playing politics" with the organisation.
Malcolm Duncan, managing director of Blaenavon-based Super Rod, who heads up the support group said: 
"I understand the need for the public to be kept informed about the activities of any Government department. But what does worry me is when politicians start to play politics with these departments, that could ultimately have a detrimental effect on both business and our economy as a whole."

"Economic Renewal: a new direction"
On Monday 5 July 2010 the Welsh Assembly Government announced plans to transform the way it supports businesses and the Welsh economy. "Economic Renewal: a new direction" is a vision to make Wales "one of the best places in the world to live, to work and to thrive".

As part of the transformation, functions previously supported by International Business Wales, Trade and Inward investment, can be accessed directly through the Welsh Government; or by visiting the Trade and Inward investment website or calling (+44) 1443 845500.

References

External links
 International Business Wales
 International Business Wales - India 
 Visit Wales
 Welsh Government
 Business in Wales
 Doing Business in Cardiff and Wales supplement, Financial Times, Tuesday July 7, 2009]
Washington Trade Mission – CNBC News story about IBW supporting over 80 Welsh companies to establish business links with major U.S. companies such as Boeing and NASA.

Government of Wales
International trade organizations
International business
Inward investment